Johnny Harris may refer to:

Johnny Harris (musician) (1932–2020), Scottish composer, producer, conductor
Johnny Harris (actor) (born 1973), English actor
Johnny Harris (EastEnders), soap opera character
Johnny Harris (journalist), filmmaker and journalist, formerly for Vox

See also
Jonny Harris (born 1975), Canadian actor and comedian
John Harris (disambiguation)